Headquartered in Manhattan, New York, Take-Two Interactive is an American video game holding company founded in September 1993 by Ryan Brant. It publishes games through 2K Games (Battleborn, BioShock, Borderlands, Evolve, Mafia, Sid Meier's Civilization, The Darkness, XCOM), 2K Play (Carnival Games), 2K Sports (NBA 2K, WWE 2K), Ghost Story Games, Private Division (Kerbal Space Program), Rockstar Games (Bully, Grand Theft Auto, L.A. Noire, Manhunt, Max Payne, Midnight Club, Red Dead) and Social Point (Tasty Town, Word Life). In the past, Take-Two operated Gathering of Developers (May 1998–September 2004), Global Star Software (August 1999–September 2007), Gotham Games (July 2002–December 2003), Mission Studios (September 1996 – 2001), On Deck Interactive (May 2000–March 2001), Take-Two Licensing (September 2003–January 2005), TalonSoft (December 1998 – 2002) and TDK Mediactive Europe (September 2003–January 2005).

Games developed

Games published 
This list includes all games developed by external and/or internal developers that were published by On Deck Interactive and Take-Two Interactive.

Games distributed

See also 

 List of 2K games, for a list of all 2K Games, 2K Play and 2K Sports titles
 List of Private Division games
 List of games by Rockstar Games
 List of Global Star Software games

References 

Take-Two Interactive
Take-Two Interactive